Leale is a surname. Notable people with the surname include:

Charles Leale (1842–1932), American surgeon
Ettore Leale (1896–1963), Italian footballer
John Leale (1892–1969), Guernsey judge and Methodist minister

See also
Meale

Surnames of French origin